Andrew George may refer to:

 Andrew George (diplomat) (born 1952), Governor and Commander-in-Chief of Anguilla
 Andrew George (politician) (born 1958), British Liberal Democrat Member of Parliament
 Andrew George (immunologist) (born 1963), professor of immunology
 Andrew R. George (born 1955), British academic and translator
 Andrew George Jr. (born 1963), Canadian First Nation chef and writer

See also
 Andrew George Blair (1844–1907), Canadian politician
 Andrew George Burry (1873–1975), American businessman
 Andrew George Lehmann (1922–2006), English academic